Des Plaines Valley Council is a former Boy Scouts of America local council that was headquartered in La Grange, Illinois, United States. In 2014 the council merged with Calumet Council, Chicago Area Council and Northwest Suburban Council to form Pathway to Adventure Council.

It was formed through the merger of West Suburban Council and Thatcher Woods Council in 1993. The council operated Camp Shin-Go-Beek near Waupaca, Wisconsin and Camp Mach-Kin-O-Siew near Elcho, Wisconsin. The council operated The BSA Adventure Camp in Rochelle, Illinois in a joint venture with Three Fires Council. The council sold Camp Tomo-Chi-Chi-Knolls in Huntley, Illinois to the Kane County Forest Preserve District as of January 1, 2007. Long before that it sold its Camp Delavan located on Lake Delavan in Wisconsin.  Des Plaines Valley Council was served by Pachsegink OA Lodge.

District Organization

District organization at the time of the merger was:

Tall Grass District services Burr Ridge, Clarendon Hills, Darien, Downers Grove, Hinsdale, Lemont, Westmont, and Willowbrook.

Twin Lakes District services Bellwood, Broadview, Elmwood Park, Forest Park, Franklin Park, Leyden Township, Maywood, Melrose Park, Northlake, Oak Park, River Forest, River Grove, and Stone Park.

Voyageur Trace District services Berwyn, Bridgeview, Brookfield, Countryside, Hodgkins, Indian Head Park, Justice, La Grange, La Grange Highlands, La Grange Park, Lyons, McCook, North Riverside, Riverside, Stickney, Westchester, Western Springs, and Willow Springs.

Camp Mach-Kin-O-Siew

Camp Mach-Kin-O-Siew (popularly known as Camp Mach) was located near Elcho, Wisconsin, in Langlade County, Wisconsin, United States, on Enterprise Lake.

With a size of approximately 590 acres surrounded by more wooded areas, it provided a northwoods wilderness type camping environment.

The camp summer program has operated for as many as 8 weeks per year.  This was eventually reduced to two weeks a year, from the last week of July to the first week of August. Scout troops stayed for 7 days at a time, checking in Sunday, checking out Saturday.

Major parts of the camp's program were its merit badge classes. A wide range of merit badges were offered. The Order of the Arrow lodge held a calling-out ceremony at camp, and candidates have the opportunity to complete their ordeal induction the following day.  Other activities included hiking, fishing, a bog hike, boating, rifle, shotgun, climbing, swimming and livesaving.

Mach's facilities included a waterfront area, a field sports area (comprising rifle, shotgun, and archery ranges), thirteen campgrounds, several piers, a campfire bowl, a climbing tower, a forge, a water slide, a shower house, and a chapel. However, the camp had no dining hall, so the Scouts cook all their meals with supplies provided by the camp (except for the first and last dinners.)

The extensive waterfront area was located on a beach along Enterprise Lake. It consists of a large swimming area, a lookout tower dedicated to the memory Of Scouter Rudolph J. Kasal, a boat dock, and a water slide. The camp owned a fleet of boats, consisting of kayaks, sunfish class sailboats, catamarans, an inboard motorboat for waterskiing, two outboard motorboats, rowboats, canoes, a dinghy, and sailboards. The camp also has two smaller lakes "Big Apple" and "Little Apple" within its borders.

The Camp Cup was a competition between the troops visiting the camp. The scoring for the Camp Cup was derived from campsite inspections and competitions in Scout skills (e.g. archery). One major competition was Monster Camp, in which troops decorate their campsite using Scout skills. Judges searched in the temporary sets for good use of Scout skills, such as lashings.

Because the Boy Scouts of America maintains a "Leave No Trace" philosophy, the Scouts that attend Camp Mach attempt to preserve the camp's natural environment. The only island in Enterprise Lake was owned by the camp. It is maintained as a wildlife sanctuary, therefore no person can set foot on the island. Other natural features include two small lakes, a bog, and a marsh.

The camp has ceased to operate as a Boy Scout camp.

Camp legends 
Camp Mach was rumored to be haunted by "Bog Bill." The story goes that one of the grounds keepers at the Kraft Manor, Bill Kraft, was on the property when he noticed the white tailed deer pen was open. He looked around and saw one of the deer running away. He chased after it. It led him onto the camp grounds and eventually to the bog.  Bill finally caught up to the deer as it got stuck in the bog. He jumped in to retrieve it safely but it began thrashing around and soon drowned him. Bogs preserve bodies  very well so legend has it he never aged. During summer camp weeks Bog Bill drags scouts under the false bottom of the bog and they never return.

Camp Shin-Go-Beek
Since 1948, Camp Shin-Go-Beek has been located near Waupaca, Wisconsin on Big Twin and Little Twin lakes. The camp is close to the chain-of-lakes area of central Wisconsin, the Crystal River and Shadow Lake (used for camp canoe trips), and many outdoor recreation areas including the Wolf and Fox Rivers. College towns of Oshkosh, Appleton, and Stevens Point are nearby.  The camp is serviced by Order of the Arrow Pachsegink Lodge.

Both Cub Scouts and Boy Scouts use Camp Shin-Go-Beek. The camp operated for several weeks in late June and early July, then the staff moved to Camp Mach-Kin-O-Siew for two weeks. The camp is home to chipmunks, deer, coyotes, and many endangered birds, such as the bald eagle, the sandhill crane, and the blue heron.

The camp has ceased to operate as a scout camp following the summer season of 2015, however the western section of the property has been acquired by the Shin-Go-Beek Foundation which has continued camping operations under the name "Camp Shin-Go-Beek". The camp was reopened to campers in 2018.

See also
 Scouting in Illinois
 Scouting in Wisconsin

References

External links
ScoutSite Search Results

Youth organizations established in 1993
Youth organizations based in Illinois
Defunct local councils of the Boy Scouts of America